James Logan (1893–1968) was a Scottish professional footballer who played in the English Football League for Plymouth Argyle in the 1920s. He played as a right half.

Logan was born in Glasgow. He played in Fife for Scottish Junior Football Association club Glencraig Celtic and for Scottish League club Cowdenbeath, before coming to England in 1919 to play for Plymouth Argyle, then a Southern League club. He made 279 appearances for the club in all competitions. Logan played in Argyle's first game in the Football League, as the Southern League Division One clubs were absorbed to form the Football League Third Division for the 1920–21 season, and went on to play 228 Football League games. He made his last appearance for Argyle in December 1928 and joined Yeovil & Petters United the following year.

References

1893 births
1968 deaths
Footballers from Glasgow
Scottish footballers
Association football wing halves
Cowdenbeath F.C. players
Plymouth Argyle F.C. players
Yeovil Town F.C. players
Southern Football League players
English Football League players
Scottish Football League players
Scottish Junior Football Association players
Place of death missing
Royal Army Service Corps soldiers
British Army personnel of World War I
Footballers from Fife
Glencraig Celtic F.C. players